Marcus Krüger (born 27 May 1990) is a Swedish professional ice hockey centreman who is currently playing as captain for Djurgårdens IF Hockey of the HockeyAllsvenskan (Allsv). He was drafted by the Chicago Blackhawks in the fifth round, 149th overall, in the 2009 NHL Entry Draft. He is a two-time Stanley Cup champion with the Blackhawks in 2013 and 2015.

Before joining the Blackhawks, Krüger previously played for Stockholm-based Djurgårdens IF then of the Swedish Hockey League (SHL). Krüger represents Sweden in international play, helping his country capture a bronze medal at the junior level and a silver medal in senior international play.

Playing career

Sweden
Krüger was announced as the first of four nominees for the 2009–10 Elitserien Rookie of the Year on 18 October 2009 after starting the season with five goals and 11 assists in just 13 games.

Chicago Blackhawks
Krüger signed a three-year contract with the Chicago Blackhawks in June 2010 but opted to stay with Djurgården during the first year of the contract He was later recalled from Djurgården to Chicago on 23 March 2011. Krüger's first full season with the Blackhawks was in 2011–12, when he played in 71 games with the club, scoring nine goals and adding 17 assists.

On 9 April 2013, in Game 5 of the Western Conference Quarter-finals, Krüger scored his first career Stanley Cup playoff goal, which happened to be the game-winner against Minnesota Wild goaltender Josh Harding. The Blackhawks eventually won the 2013 Stanley Cup, with Krüger contributing three goals during the team's run. After his playoff success with the team, Krüger signed a two-year extension with the Blackhawks on 12 July 2013.

He scored eight goals and 20 assists in 81 games for Chicago during the 2013–14 NHL season. On 19 May 2015, he scored the game-winning triple overtime away goal to tie the Western Conference finals 1–1 against the Anaheim Ducks.

On 11 September 2015, Krüger signed a one-year, 1.5 million dollar contract to stay with the Blackhawks for the 2015–16 season. On 17 December, Krüger dislocated his wrist in a game against the Edmonton Oilers. He was projected to miss at least four months while recovering from the injury.  On 27 February 2016 the Blackhawks announced that Krüger would be switching his number to 22 in order for his new teammate acquired from the Winnipeg Jets, Andrew Ladd, to keep his traditional number 16. On 9 March, The Blackhawks signed Krüger to a three-year, $9.25 million contract extension that runs through the 2018–19 season.

Carolina Hurricanes
After completing his seventh season with the Blackhawks, Krüger was long rumored as a candidate to be traded away due to considerable salary cap constraints. With a reported deal to the Vegas Golden Knights pre-dating the 2017 NHL Expansion Draft for draft considerations, Krüger surprisingly remained with Chicago through to the opening of free agency. On 2 July 2017, Krüger was dealt by the Blackhawks to the Golden Knights in exchange for future considerations. On 4 July 2017, Krüger was then moved on by the Golden Knights in a trade to the Carolina Hurricanes for a 5th-round pick in the 2018 NHL Entry Draft. Krüger was placed on injured reserve by the Hurricanes on 3 January 2018, and was placed on waivers on 8 February.

Return to Chicago
On 3 May, Krüger was initially traded by the Hurricanes to the Arizona Coyotes along with a third-round pick in the 2018 NHL Entry Draft, in exchange for forward Jordan Martinook and a fourth-round pick in the 2018 NHL Entry Draft. On 12 July 2018, Krüger was then traded by the Coyotes back to the Blackhawks along with prospect MacKenzie Entwistle, Jordan Maletta, and Andrew Campbell in a deal that sent the contract of Marián Hossa to the Coyotes, along with Vinnie Hinostroza, Jordan Oesterle and a third-round pick in the 2019 NHL Entry Draft.

ZSC Lions
Following the 2018–19 season, Krüger ended his nine-year career in the NHL, returning to Europe as a free agent in signing a two-year contract with Swiss club ZSC Lions of the NL on 5 July 2019. On 17 February 2021, Krüger was signed to an early one-year contract extension through to the end of the 2021–22 season.

International play

 

Krüger has represented Sweden three times in international play. At the junior level, he helped his country capture a bronze medal at the 2010 World Junior Championships. After graduating to the senior level, Krüger has played for Sweden twice, in 2011 (finishing with a silver medal) and 2012. He also represented Sweden in the 2014 Winter Olympics. After several injuries to the team's centremen, Krüger played on Sweden's first line in the tournament final against Canada, which the Swedes lost 3–0.

Career statistics

Regular season and playoffs

International

References

External links

1990 births
Living people
Carolina Hurricanes players
Charlotte Checkers (2010–) players
Chicago Blackhawks draft picks
Chicago Blackhawks players
Djurgårdens IF Hockey players
Ice hockey players at the 2014 Winter Olympics
Ice hockey players at the 2022 Winter Olympics
Medalists at the 2014 Winter Olympics
Olympic ice hockey players of Sweden
Olympic medalists in ice hockey
Olympic silver medalists for Sweden
Rockford IceHogs (AHL) players
Ice hockey people from Stockholm
Stanley Cup champions
Swedish expatriate ice hockey players in the United States
Swedish ice hockey centres
Swedish people of German descent
ZSC Lions players